Playin' with Your Head is the 11th album and fifth HBO special by American comedian George Carlin.

Background

The album was recorded May 2–3, 1986, at the Beverly Theater in Los Angeles, and was released on July 30, 1986, on the Eardrum/Atlantic label. It was Carlin's fifth HBO stand-up concert special. In the HBO airing there is a short skit before and after the show in which he flees from three men seeking an envelope in his possession before going on stage. The identities of his pursuers are unknown - the credits before the skit merely dubs them "The Bad Guys" - but are played by Vic Tayback (of Alice fame), Rick Ducommun, and Anthony James. Carlin tears the envelope up after the performance, never revealing its contents or why his pursuers wanted it. At the end of the closing credits, the envelope is seen back on the table.

Track listing

References

External links
George Carlin's official website

1980s American television specials
1980s in comedy
HBO network specials
Stand-up comedy concert films
George Carlin live albums
Stand-up comedy albums
Spoken word albums by American artists
Live spoken word albums
1986 live albums
1986 television specials
1980s comedy albums